Helene Gigstad Fauske (born 31 January 1997) is a Norwegian handball player for Brest Bretagne Handball and formerly the Norwegian national team.

She also represented Norway at the 2016 Women's Junior World Handball Championship, placing 5th, at the 2015 Women's Under-19 European Handball Championship, placing 6th and at the 2013 Youth European Championship, placing 7th.

In October 2020, Fauske announced that she no longer would be available to the national team, but made a comeback in 2022.

During her first season with Brest Bretagne Handball (2021–2022), she was the club's top goalscorer in the French League (118 goals in 27 matches, 6th top goalscorer) and in the Champions League (87 goals; 6th top goalscorer).

Achievements

Club
Danish league (Damehåndboldligaen):
Runner up: 2019 (with Herning-Ikast Håndbold)
Danish Cup
Winner: 2019 (with Herning-Ikast Håndbold)
French league:
Runner up: 2022 (with Brest Bretagne Handball)

International
World Championship:
Silver: 2017

Individual awards
 Best Rookie of Grundigligaen: 2016/2017
 All-Star Left Back of Grundigligaen: 2016/2017
 All-Star Centre Back of Damehåndboldligaen: 2018/2019
 Danish League's Player of the Month: January 2019
 Top Scorer of the EHF European League with 61 goals: 2020/21
 French League's Player of the Month: February 2022

References

External links

1997 births
Living people
Sportspeople from Bærum
Norwegian female handball players
Expatriate handball players
Norwegian expatriate sportspeople in Denmark